The  2nd Vijay Awards  ceremony honoring the winners of the best of Tamil film industry in 2007 was held  at Jawaharlal Nehru Indoor Stadium on 3 May 2008.

Winners

References

2008 Indian film awards
Vijay Awards